The 1955 LPGA Tour was the sixth season since the LPGA Tour officially began in 1950. The season ran from January 6 to October 9. The season consisted of 27 official money events. Patty Berg won the most tournaments, six. She also led the money list with earnings of $16,492.

The season saw the first winner from outside the United States, Fay Crocker from Uruguay. It also included the last of Babe Zaharias's 41 wins, she died the following year. The LPGA added a major championship to its schedule, the LPGA Championship, won by Beverly Hanson. Another major, the Women's Western Open, changed its format from match play to stroke play.

The tournament results and award winners are listed below.

Tournament results
The following table shows all the official money events for the 1955 season. "Date" is the ending date of the tournament. The numbers in parentheses after the winners' names are the number of wins they had on the tour up to and including that event. Majors are shown in bold.

Awards

References

External links
LPGA Tour official site

LPGA Tour seasons
LPGA Tour